Javar Tan (also Romanized as Jāvar Tan, Javer Tan, and Jūratān; also known as Jāyartan) is a village in Dasturan Rural District, in the Central District of Joghatai County, Razavi Khorasan Province, Iran. At the 2006 census, its population was 172, in 50 families.

References 

Populated places in Joghatai County